Thang Thanh Nguyen (born March 20, 1969) is a Vietnamese convicted murderer who was on the FBI Ten Most Wanted Fugitives List. Nguyen was one of four men who robbed and murdered businessman Chung Lam in Irondequoit, New York, on January 26, 1992. After the murder Nguyen fled the country for five years, while his three accomplices were arrested. Nguyen was added to the FBI Ten Most Wanted Fugitives List on August 3, 1996, and was arrested on December 22, 1997. He was initually sentenced to 37 1⁄2 years to life in prison, but that was later reduced to 25 years in 2003.

Early life  
Nguyen is a native of Sóc Trăng, Vietnam, having been born there on March 20, 1969. He first entered the United States in 1984 and registered as a legal citizen. He worked as a restaurant cook and was an active gambler.

Murder 
One establishment he worked at was the Saigon Vietnamese and Chinese restaurant, owned by 39-year-old Vietnamese immigrant Chung Lam in Irondequoit, New York. Lam had fled to U.S. to seek refuge after the Vietnam War. Nguyen worked their until he was fired. He then moved to Fort Worth, Texas, where he befriended Thoan Van Luc and brothers Vu Ngo and Sang Ngo of Wichita, Kansas. 

On January 26, 1992, the four broke into Lam's Irondequoit home at 72 Veronica Drive. Lam shared the home with his wife, four daughters, and two brothers. The men stormed to the second floor, where Lam was standing of the patio, and Nguyen proceeded to shoot him in the head. One of the other men shot one of Lam's brothers. 

The four then ransacked the whole house stealing money and jewelry. During the gunfire, Sang Ngo was shot accidentally. All four fled the home while Sang went to the hospital. Police were called and Lam was rushed to the Rochester General Hospital, but he died at 4:52 a.m. from his wound.

Investigation 
Sang, suffering from a bullet wound he could not explain, was immediately implicated in the crime and arrested. He confessed, with Vu and Thoan being arrested not long after. In early 1992, having still not been arrested by police, Nguyen fled to his home country Vietnam. Later in 1993, Vu Ngo was put on trial for second degree murder. After deliberating for two days, the jury acquitted him. All three were convicted of burglary and given lengthy prison terms. 

Nguyen was indicted on a murder charge by a Monroe County grand jury. Investigators had accused Nguyen of being the ringleader of the murder. On August 3, 1996, the Federal Bureau of Investigation (FBI) charged Nguyen with unlawful flight to avoid prosecution and added him to their Ten Most Wanted Fugitives List as number 446. He was also featured on the tv show America's Most Wanted.

Arrest and trial 
On December 22, 1997, Nguyen was arrested by military police in Bac Lieu, Vietnam, while at his family's home. He was extradited to the U.S. in January 1998. He was charged with second-degree murder, attempted second-degree murder, first-degree burglary and first-degree robbery. Nguyen and his lawyers argued to a judge that he had been "illegally apprehended" and "forced to confess". His trial opened in mid-July. In opening statements prosecutors argued that Nguyen was the mastermind behind the murder and that the evidence overwhelmingly supports it. In August 1998 he was convicted and sentenced to 25 years to life in prison for the murder charge and 12 1⁄2 to 25 years for the robbery charge. In total he would have to serve at least 37 1⁄2 years to be eligible for parole, which would be in 2035. In October 2003, an appellate court of the New York Supreme Court reduced Nguyen's sentence from 37 1⁄2 years to life to 25 years to life, making him eligible for parole in 2023. If paroled, he will be deported to Vietnam as an illegal immigrant and will be prohibited from ever reentering the United States.

See also 
 FBI Ten Most Wanted Fugitives, 1990s

References

External links 
 Incarcerated Lookup

Living people
1969 births
20th-century American criminals
American male criminals
American people convicted of murder
American prisoners sentenced to life imprisonment
People convicted of murder by New York (state)
Prisoners sentenced to life imprisonment by New York (state)
FBI Ten Most Wanted Fugitives
Fugitives
1992 murders in the United States